Cover Up is a 1949 American film noir mystery film directed by Alfred E. Green starring Dennis O'Keefe, William Bendix and Barbara Britton. O'Keefe also co-wrote the screenplay, credited as Jonathan Rix. The murder mystery takes place during the Christmas season.

Plot
In a small Midwestern town, Roger Phillips is found dead. When insurance investigator Sam Donovan (O'Keefe) arrives looking into the apparent suicide, all clues lead him to suspect murder. The man was shot, but there are no powder burns on the body (which would indicate he was not shot at close range) nor was a pistol found. Unfortunately, no one wants to assist him with the case, including Sheriff Larry Best (Bendix), despite a double indemnity clause. It turns out the dead man was universally hated.

One of the prime suspects is Frank Baker, who eloped with Phillips' niece the night of the death when Phillips objected to the marriage. During the investigation, Sam and local girl Anita Weatherby (Britton) are strongly attracted to each other. This causes complications when Anita finds her father's hidden Luger pistol (Phillips was shot with a Luger) while searching for a place to store her diary away from her inquisitive younger sister.

Meanwhile, at the annual town Christmas tree lighting, the residents are grieved to learn that beloved longtime physician Dr. Gerrow has died of a heart attack.

Finally, Sam plants a false story in the newspaper, stating that he has sent for a chemist to find clues of the killer's identity from the floor of the house where Phillips died. The chemist is due very soon, so Sam waits for the murderer at the scene of the crime. Sheriff Best shows up first, but he knew the story was a fake. Next to arrive is Anita's father, Stu Weatherby, followed by Anita. Sam accuses Stu of the crime, but then realizes from the position of the murderer that he had to have been left-handed, which rules Stu out. Then Sam remembers, from his previous investigation, that Dr. Gerrow was left-handed. Stu confirms Sam's guess. Weatherby came upon Dr. Gerrow, just after the doctor snapped and killed the man responsible for so much misery to his loved townspeople. He talked Gerrow out of turning himself in and took the Luger away.

Sam finally decides that the town will be better off if Gerrow's memory is protected, and agrees to report Phillips' death as suicide.

Cast

 Dennis O'Keefe as Sam Donovan 
 William Bendix as Sheriff Larry Best 
 Barbara Britton as Anita Weatherby 
 Art Baker as Stu Weatherby
 Ann E. Todd as Cathie Weatherby
 Doro Merande as Hilda
 Virginia Christine as Margaret Baker
 Helen Spring as Bessie Weatherby
 Ruth Lee as Mrs. Abbey
 Henry Hall as Mayor
 Russell Armes as Frank Baker
 Dan White as Gabe
 Paul E. Burns as Mr. Abbey
 Emmett Vogan as Blakely
 Jamesson Shade as Editor
 Jack Lee as Addison
 Worden Norton as Undertaker
 George MacDonald as Boy in Movie Theatre

Production
According to Madeleine Stowe, guest host of the May 21, 2016, Turner Classic Movies screening of Cover Up, the producer changed the time of the film, feeling the subject was unsuitable for a Christmas setting. Star Dennis O'Keefe, who also co-wrote the script, strongly resisted the change and won.

This was the first film produced by O'Keefe's new production company, according to Stowe.

Preservation 
Cover Up was preserved and restored by the UCLA Film and Television Archive from two 35mm nitrate composite prints. Restoration funding provided by The Packard Humanities Institute in collaboration with the Library of Congress. The restoration premiered at the UCLA Festival of Preservation in 2022.

References

External links
 
 
 
 
 

1949 films
1949 crime films
1949 mystery films
1940s Christmas films
American black-and-white films
American Christmas films
American crime films
American mystery films
1940s English-language films
Film noir
Films directed by Alfred E. Green
United Artists films
Films scored by Hans J. Salter
1940s American films